The discography of the Japanese band Princess Princess consists of nine studio albums, twelve compilation albums, and twenty one singles released since 1986.

Albums

Studio albums

Extended plays

Live albums

Compilations

Box sets

Tribute albums

Singles

Videography

Music video albums

Live video albums

Akasaka Komachi discography 
On February 20, 1983, the members of what would later become Princess Princess first formed as  after passing auditions hosted by TDK Records. They named themselves after Akasaka, Tokyo, the location of TDK's headquarters. Shortly after the release of their debut EP  in 1984 (for the TV Tokyo anime series of the same name), the band changed its name to  before finally settling with Princess Princess in 1986.

Extended plays

Compilation albums

Singles

See also 
 List of best-selling music artists in Japan

Footnotes

References

External links 
 

Discography
Discographies of Japanese artists
Pop music group discographies
Rock music group discographies